Marquess of O'Shea is a noble title in the peerage of Spain, bestowed on Paloma O'Shea, by King Juan Carlos I on 11 July 2008. It was granted in recognition of her vast contribution to music and patronage in Spain.

The Marchioness of O'Shea was married to the late Emilio Botín, Executive Chairman of Banco Santander, and is the mother of Ana Botín, who succeeded him in 2014, becoming the 9th most powerful woman in the world, according to Forbes.

Marquesses of O'Shea

Paloma O'Shea, 1st Marchioness of O'Shea (2008–present)

See also
Spanish nobility

References

Lists of Spanish nobility
2008 establishments in Spain